The GMC Acadia is a crossover SUV manufactured by General Motors for its GMC marque. The first-generation GMC Acadia shared the GM Lambda platform with the Saturn Outlook, the Chevrolet Traverse, and the Buick Enclave. The Acadia went on sale in 2006 as a 2007 model in the United States, Canada and Mexico. The Acadia replaces three of the 7- or 8-seater vehicles on the Pontiac–Buick–GMC dealership network, the midsize GMC Safari van, the GMC Envoy, and the Pontiac Montana SV6 minivan for the domestic market. As of 2009, the Lambda vehicles have replaced the Buick Rainier, Buick Rendezvous, Buick Terraza, and the GMC Envoy XL and then subsequently the GMC Envoy, Chevrolet TrailBlazer and the Isuzu Ascender. A Denali version of the Acadia debuted for 2011. In 2017, the second generation Acadia was repositioned as a mid-size crossover utility vehicle in order to compete within the growing midsize SUV market against the likes of the Ford Explorer, Edge, and Jeep Grand Cherokee.

First generation (2007)

The Acadia represents GMC's entry-level truck-like CUV and is the first unibody vehicle from the marque. It is also GMC's first front-wheel drive passenger vehicle, and also the first such vehicle of any kind since the 1973-78 GMC Motorhome.

The Acadia has seating for eight and either front or all-wheel drive. With a  towing capacity, the Acadia slots between the GMC Terrain and the Yukon. The Acadia is the mid-priced Lambda model between the Chevrolet Traverse and Enclave.

In December 2006, all production and sales of the Acadia (and the Saturn Outlook) were temporarily stopped due to the engine mounts not having holes drilled to release accumulated water, as well as an issue with potentially faulty rivets in the load floor just forward of the vehicle's rear hatch. The assembly process was quickly adjusted, and dealership sales of the vehicles had resumed within days of the notice.

The first-generation Acadia was sold alongside its second-generation replacement as the Acadia Limited.

Suspension and chassis
The 2008 Acadia has a  wheelbase and  front/rear tracks. The independent front suspension is a MacPherson strut design, with a direct-acting stabilizer bar and aluminum knuckles. The independent rear suspension uses a "H" Linked design.

Steering is power-assisted rack-and-pinion, with an optional variable-effort system. Four-wheel disc brakes with ABS are standard. 19 inch cast aluminum wheels and Goodyear Eagle RS-A M+S P255/60R-19 108H tires with a high-pressure compact spare tire are standard on the SLT2 model and optional on the SLT1. The SLE model has 18 inch painted aluminum wheels with P255/65R-18 tires. The SLT1 comes standard with 18 inch machined aluminum wheels.

Engine and transmission
The Acadia uses GM's High Feature LY7 V6 that was introduced in the Cadillac CTS. The Acadia also uses the new GM-Ford 6-speed automatic transmission.

The 2016 Acadia Limited has a 3.6 L V6 engine producing 310 hp (231 kW) and 271 lb ft (367 Nm) of torque.

Interior
The Acadia features available 3-row, 7 or 8-seater seating, although the post-2017 models downsized the 3rd-row seating capacity from 3 to 2 passengers. Inside, the Acadia features more contemporary trim than the Outlook, including chrome and satin nickel textures, and a wider variety of two-toned interior colors such as an Ebony and Light Titanium (grey) cloth upholstery, and a choice of either Ebony, Light Titanium (grey) or Brick (brown) leather upholstery. A heads-up display is one of the available options exclusive to the Acadia and standard on the Acadia Denali.

Acadia Denali

The Denali version of the Acadia arrived at dealerships in 2010 as 2011 model. This upgraded trim is available in FWD and AWD versions in seven- or eight-passenger form and features monotone paint, honeycomb grille, unique front and rear fascias, along with HID headlamps, chrome accents, exhaust tips, and six-spoke 20-inch wheels. Interior upgrades include perforated leather seating and wood trim.

The Acadia Denali joins its SUV siblings, the Terrain Denali, the Yukon Denali and Yukon XL Denali, and marks GMC's first crossover to take the Denali badge.

Trim levels

Safety
A unibody construction helps lower center of gravity, compared to previous truck-based GM SUVs, reduces the risk of rollover accidents. Much of the Acadia's structure is reinforced with high-strength steel, including a steel cross-car beam welded across the floor between the B-pillars.

The Acadia has six different airbags equipped in the vehicle; two dual-stage front air bags for the driver and front passenger, two seat-mounted side-impact air bags in the first row and two head curtain side impact air bags that cover all three seating rows. Similar to the Volvo XC90, the Acadia will have a detection system on board that will deploy various airbags if a rollover is detected.

Additionally, the Acadia comes standard with the OnStar system.

Model year updates

2013 facelift
GM unveiled an updated 2013 GMC Acadia at the 2012 Chicago Auto Show, taking the bodyshell of the discontinued Saturn Outlook. The 2013 Acadia received a completely redesigned grille and front fascia, a redesigned rear liftgate, and an improved interior with upgrades to interior quality, as with its other two updated siblings, the Buick Enclave and Chevrolet Traverse.

2014 model year
For the 2014 model year, the Acadia added Forward Collision Alert and Lane Departure Warning as a standard on Denali and as an optional feature on SLT1 and SLT2 trims, while two charging-only USB ports on the rear of the center console for second-row use were added as a standard for all trims.

2015 model year
For the 2015 model year, a heated, leather-wrapped steering wheel became standard on SLT-2 and Denali models, along with a twenty-inch aluminum wheel design. Crimson Red Tintcoat, Dark Sapphire Blue Metallic, and Midnight Amethyst Metallic are added as new exterior color palettes. In addition, dual exhaust became available only on Denali versions, while all other trim levels received single exhaust.

Acadia Limited
For the 2017 model year, the first-generation Acadia was sold alongside its second-generation replacement, but was renamed the Acadia Limited, much like the Chevrolet Cruze Limited, Chevrolet Malibu Limited, and Chevrolet Impala Limited were also sold alongside their replacements - at least for a single model year - as rental and fleet vehicles. However, production remained in Lansing, Michigan as the second generation Acadia moved to Spring Hill, Tennessee, the site of the original Saturn plant. With the second-generation Buick Enclave and Chevrolet Traverse making their debuts in 2017 as 2018 models, GMC ended production of the Acadia Limited on March 31, 2017 in order to start production on the Traverse and Enclave.

Second generation (2017)

The second generation Acadia made its official debut at the North American International Auto Show on January 12, 2016. The redesigned Acadia went on sale in May 2016 as a 2017 model. The second generation Acadia is built in Spring Hill, Tennessee. The previous Acadia continued to be sold alongside the new one as the "Acadia Limited" through the 2017 model year.

With the reduction from full-size to mid-size, the Acadia's MSRP was reduced to $29,995 (US). The GMC Acadia now has 5, 6, and 7 passenger configurations arranged respectively like either two front bucket seats and one rear bench seat; two bucket seats up front, two buckets in the second row, and two seats in the rear row; or two front bucket seats, one second row bench seat, and two rear seats in the third row.

The second generation Acadia features seven seats instead of eight, a choice of either a 2.5-liter or 3.6-liter engine, a new advanced twin-clutch AWD system (available only with All-Terrain package) by GKN Driveline designed for off-road environment (joining the FWD and AWD drivetrains available on all other models), an updated fascia and redesigned lighting. The Acadia is built on the same platform as the Cadillac XT5 and will be joined by the Chinese-built Buick Envision and the Chevrolet Blazer (built on the C1XX platform) when GM unveils its lineup for its mid-size CUVs for 2018 and beyond.

With the decrease in size, fuel economy with the 3.6L increases to  city,  hwy (AWD and FWD) from  city  hwy (FWD). The 2017 Acadia will offer the newly launched AppShop feature.

Trim levels for the second generation Acadia were carried over from the previous generation; SL, SLE-1, SLE-2, SLT-1, SLT-2, as well as a Denali trim level, though an All-Terrain Package is available on Acadia SLE and SLT trim levels that will be more rugged in its appearance. The second generation Acadia is also available with Third Row Seat Delete option on SLE and SLT trim levels as part of the All-Terrain Package.

The second generation Acadia introduced a feature to remind drivers to check the rear seats for children to help prevent heatstroke of children accidentally left behind in a vehicle.

Holden Acadia
The Acadia was marketed in Australia and New Zealand as a Holden-badged vehicle. It went on sale on November 12, 2018. The Holden Acadia was built in Tennessee with RHD specifications, and marketed as a full-size CUV. The Acadia was chosen for Australian exports due to its smaller size compared to its Chevrolet and Buick counterparts, which are the Traverse and Enclave respectively.

The Holden Acadia was due to receive an update for 2020 like the GMC Acadia, but it was canceled due to the Holden brand being phased out in 2020. A total of 5,157 units were sold during its sales period.

Model year updates

2020 facelift
The GMC Acadia received a facelift for 2020. The facelift introduced new exterior styling (including a new front grille inspired by the all-new 2019 GMC Sierra 1500), a revised infotainment system with Apple CarPlay and Android Auto smartphone integration, new alloy wheel options, an all-new AT4 trim level (which replaces the All-Terrain Package on select trim levels), a new 2.0L turbocharged EcoTec inline four-cylinder (I4) engine (both the 2.5L EcoTec I4 and 3.6L VVT V6 engine options remain available for 2020), and the Electronic Precision Shift push-button automatic transmission that was first introduced on the 2018 GMC Terrain, this shifter was paired to a new 9-speed automatic, among other changes. The 2020 GMC Acadia went on sale in the fall of 2019.

2021 
GMC introduced some minor changes for the 2021 model year. Wireless functionality for Apple CarPlay and Android Auto was added, as well as the debut of an Elevation Edition package that adds black exterior styling accents and 20-inch wheels.

2022 

The GMC Acadia received a few updates for 2022, the most notable was the discontinuation of the 2.5 LCV I4 engine, which was standard on lower trim levels, the new standard engine became the turbocharged 2.0L LSY I4 while the 3.6L V6 LGX will still be available as an option. All engines were still paired to a 9-speed automatic transmission. The base SL trim level was also dropped, this made the SLE the base model from 2022 onwards. The five-passenger seating option was also discontinued for 2022, this configuration was only offered in the AT4 trim level, and removed the third row seats entirely.

Sales

References

External links

 
 

All-wheel-drive vehicles
Mid-size sport utility vehicles
Crossover sport utility vehicles
Front-wheel-drive vehicles
Acadia
2010s cars
Vehicles built in Lansing, Michigan
Cars introduced in 2006
Motor vehicles manufactured in the United States